Presidents Park was a ten-acre sculpture park and associated indoor museum formerly located in Williamsburg, Virginia in the United States.

The statues were sculpted by Houston artist David Adickes, who was inspired as he drove past Mount Rushmore when returning from a trip to Canada. The park was opened in March 2004 by local visitor attraction entrepreneur Everette H. "Haley" Newman III, who had been slowly taking delivery of the busts since 2000.

The park had financial troubles and was closed on September 30, 2010. Creditors put the park up for auction (not including the busts) on September 28, 2012, after a foreclosure auction originally scheduled for April 26, 2012 was cancelled without explanation.  By January 10, 2013, the busts had been moved to private storage at a nearby local farm in Croaker, Virginia by Howard Hankins.  In 2017, National Geographic showcased a video in which Mr Hankins expresses a hope to rehabilitate the statues for a park in the future.

Similar park near Deadwood, South Dakota
Artist David Adickes sculpted a second set of Presidential busts. They were placed on display at a similar outdoor park museum setting in  Lead near Deadwood, South Dakota which was operated by the artist himself, until it too closed after financial difficulties.

Some of the South Dakota busts could still be seen in 2015 at various RV parks and hotels around the Dakotas.
 The busts of Presidents John F. Kennedy, Ronald Reagan and George W. Bush are located near Mount Rushmore at the Southern Hills RV Park and Campground in Hermosa, South Dakota.
 President Abraham Lincoln's bust graces the Lincoln RV Park on U.S. 85 south of Williston, North Dakota.
 President Theodore Roosevelt's bust is stationed at the Roosevelt Inn in Watford City, North Dakota.

Sources

Buildings and monuments honoring American presidents in the United States
Museums in Williamsburg, Virginia
Art museums and galleries in Virginia
Presidential museums in Virginia
Sculpture gardens, trails and parks in the United States
Parks in Williamsburg, Virginia
Defunct museums in Virginia
2004 establishments in Virginia
Museums established in 2004
2010 disestablishments in Virginia
Museums disestablished in 2010